WXPJ (91.9 FM) is a non-commercial radio station owned and operated by University of Pennsylvania.

History
WXPJ signed on in December 1957 as WNTI, broadcasting programs produced by Centenary College students as well as the Centenary Singers.  The call letters stood for Nosce Te Ipsum, a latin phrase meaning "know thyelf."

WNTI evolved from broadcasting a few hours per day during the school year to (in 1995 under the leadership of prof. Eric Slater) being on the air 365 days a year, 24 hours a day.

WNTI commemorated its 40th anniversary in December 1997 with a CD release entitled "A Celebration of WNTI."  The CD featured many musicians who over the years appeared on the station with in-studio performances and played at station fund raisers. It was produced by Ralph Drake, who served as Program director for over a decade.

The station evolved over the years, as Centenary College moved from being an all-women's college to coed in the late 1980s. Under the Direction  of Prof. Eric Slater and then student Ralph Drake in 1995 WNTI, was one of the first in the world to "webcast" on the internet, thanks to a free encoder given to the station by Real Networks.

In October 2015, WNTI and University of Pennsylvania station WXPN jointly announced a sales agreement for transfer of ownership of WNTI. The sale price is $1,250,000 in cash and another $500,000 in underwriting value over 10 years. A Public Service Operating Agreement enabled WXPN to begin using the WNTI transmission facilities to air WXPN programming, effective October 15, 2015.

On May 16, 2016, the FM station changed its call sign to WXPJ. The sale to the University of Pennsylvania was consummated on June 14, 2016.

WNTI.org - Internet Radio
WNTI.org broadcasts on the web primarily featured an Adult Album Alternative format with the slogan "The Sound of Centenary," "Where Great Music Lives" and "Internet Radio from Centenary College". The station broadcasts jazz, world, bluegrass, blues and other music programs on nights and weekends. Most of the programming was locally originated, but the station also carried nationally syndicated programs including World Cafe, Little Steven's Underground Garage and Acoustic Cafe.

The station continues to sponsor local concert series, car shows and other events.

References

External links

 WNTI.org | The Sound of Centenary

1957 establishments in New Jersey
XPJ
Adult album alternative radio stations in the United States
NPR member stations
XPJ
Radio stations established in 1957
Hackettstown, New Jersey
University of Pennsylvania